Kacper Żuk was the defending champion but lost in the quarterfinals to Christopher O'Connell.

O'Connell won the title after Zsombor Piros retired trailing 3–6, 0–2 in the final.

Seeds

Draw

Finals

Top half

Bottom half

References

External links
Main draw
Qualifying draw

Split Open - 1
2022 Singles